Desolation Angels is the fifth studio album by English rock supergroup Bad Company, released on March 17, 1979. Paul Rodgers revealed on In the Studio with Redbeard (which devoted an episode to Desolation Angels) that the album's title came from the 1965 novel of the same name by Jack Kerouac. The title was almost used 10 years previous to name the second album from Rodgers' previous band, Free, which in the end was called simply Free.

Desolation Angels was recorded at Ridge Farm Studios in Surrey, England in late 1978. It is considered the last strong album by Bad Company with the original lineup,  mostly because it contains their last major hit, "Rock 'n' Roll Fantasy", written by Paul Rodgers and inspired by a guitar synthesizer riff which Rodgers had come up with. The album reached No. 3 on the U.S. Billboard album charts in 1979 and went platinum in 1979 and double platinum subsequently.  It was their final top ten album in both the U.S. and the UK.

In addition to "Rock 'n' Roll Fantasy", "Gone, Gone, Gone", written by bassist Boz Burrell, also received substantial airplay on rock stations. 

A cover version of "Oh, Atlanta", written by Mick Ralphs, was recorded by Alison Krauss and appears on her 1995 album Now That I've Found You: A Collection.  The original version was used in the open to The Nashville Network's 1993 broadcast of the Motorcraft 500 when ABC (which originally had the broadcast) could not find time to air the race, which had been postponed six days by a snowstorm in the Atlanta Motor Speedway.

The album was remastered and re-released in 1994. In 2020, Rhino put out a deluxe edition to honor the 40th anniversary with many alternate versions and bonus tracks.

Track listing

Personnel 
Bad Company
 Paul Rodgers – vocals, guitar, piano, synthesisers
 Mick Ralphs – guitar, keyboards
 Boz Burrell – bass
 Simon Kirke – drums

Additional personnel
The Bones – backing vocals (10)

Production
Bad Company – producer
Tony Patrick – recording engineer
Hipgnosis – sleeve design, photography
Christel Johansson – photo model
Peter Christopherson – photo model

Charts 
Album – Billboard (United States)

Singles – Billboard (United States)

References

External links 
 Bad Company - Desolation Angels (1979) album review by Mike DeGagne, credits & releases at AllMusic
 Bad Company - Desolation Angels (1979) album releases & credits at Discogs
 Bad Company - Desolation Angels (1979) album to be listened as stream on Spotify

1979 albums
Albums with cover art by Hipgnosis
Bad Company albums
Swan Song Records albums